NGC 2040 is an open star cluster located 160,000 light years away in the constellation of Dorado. It is a young group of stars in one of the largest star formation regions of the Large Magellanic Cloud.

References

External links
 

Stellar associations
2040
Dorado (constellation)
Large Magellanic Cloud